Pleurobranchaea meckeli is a species of sea slug, specifically a side gill slug or notaspideans. It is a marine gastropod mollusc in the family Pleurobranchaeidae.

Description
The length of the body attains ,

Distribution
This marine species occurs in the Mediterranean Sea and in the North Atlantic Ocean off Cape Verde and Portugal.

References

External links 
 

Pleurobranchaeidae
Gastropods described in 1813
Molluscs of the Atlantic Ocean
Molluscs of the Mediterranean Sea
Molluscs of Europe
Gastropods of Cape Verde